Liu Zhentang (born February 1945) is a senior Chinese diplomat on Gulf and Middle East Affairs.
He was Chinese Ambassador to Lebanon from 1998 to 2002 and Ambassador to Iran from 2002 to 2007.
Liu was born in Dandong, Liaoning in 1945. He graduated from Beijing Second Foreign Language Institute with a bachelor's degree in Arabic Studies in 1969 and has been working for the Chinese Foreign Ministry since 1972.
In 2010, he served as Deputy Commissioner General for Shanghai World Expo.
In 2012, he was appointed Distinguished Professor of the MOE Arab Research Center.

Liu is currently Vice Chairman of China-Iran Friendship Association, Trustee of China-Arab Friendship Association and President of the Association of Former Diplomats of China (AFDC).

References 

Ambassadors of China to Iran
Ambassadors of China to Lebanon
Beijing International Studies University people
1945 births
Living people
Politicians from Dandong
Chinese Communist Party politicians from Liaoning
People's Republic of China politicians from Liaoning